The 1909 New York Highlanders season saw the team finishing with a total of 74 wins and 77 losses, coming in 5th in the American League.

New York was managed by George Stallings, the team's fourth manager in as many years. Games were played at Hilltop Park. The alternate and equally unofficial nickname, "Yankees", was being used more and more frequently by the media. The eventually-famous curving "NY" logo appeared for the first time, on the sleeve and cap of the uniform.

Regular season

Season standings

Record vs. opponents

Roster

Player stats

Batting

Starters by position 
Note: Pos = Position; G = Games played; AB = At bats; H = Hits; Avg. = Batting average; HR = Home runs; RBI = Runs batted in

Other batters 
Note: G = Games played; AB = At bats; H = Hits; Avg. = Batting average; HR = Home runs; RBI = Runs batted in

Pitching

Starting pitchers 
Note: G = Games pitched; IP = Innings pitched; W = Wins; L = Losses; ERA = Earned run average; SO = Strikeouts

Other pitchers 
Note: G = Games pitched; IP = Innings pitched; W = Wins; L = Losses; ERA = Earned run average; SO = Strikeouts

Relief pitchers 
Note: G = Games pitched; W = Wins; L = Losses; SV = Saves; ERA = Earned run average; SO = Strikeouts

References 
1909 New York Highlanders team page at www.baseball-almanac.com
1909 New York Highlanders page at Baseball Reference

New York Yankees seasons
New York Highlanders
New York Highlanders
1900s in Manhattan
Washington Heights, Manhattan